Kei Nishikori was the two-time defending champion and successfully defended his title, defeating Kevin Anderson 6–4, 6–4 in the final.

Seeds
The top four seeds receive a bye into the second round.

Draw

Finals

Top half

Bottom half

Qualifying

Seeds

 Filip Krajinović (qualifying competition, lucky loser)
 Adrián Menéndez Maceiras (second round)
 Denis Kudla (qualified)
 Victor Hănescu (qualifying competition)
 Thanasi Kokkinakis (qualified)
 Michael Russell (second round)
 Austin Krajicek (qualified)
 Ryan Harrison (qualified)

Qualifiers

Lucky losers

Qualifying draw

First qualifier

Second qualifier

Third qualifier

Fourth qualifier

External links
 Main draw
 Qualifying draw

Memphis Open - Singles
2015 Men's Singles